The Omega Man (stylized as The Ωmega Man) is a 1971 American post-apocalyptic action film directed by Boris Sagal and starring Charlton Heston as a survivor of a pandemic. It was written by John William Corrington and Joyce Corrington, based on the 1954 novel I Am Legend by Richard Matheson. The film's producer, Walter Seltzer, went on to work with Heston again in the dystopian science-fiction film Soylent Green in 1973.

The Omega Man is the second adaptation of Matheson's novel. The first was The Last Man on Earth (1964), which starred Vincent Price. A third adaptation, I Am Legend, starring Will Smith, was released in 2007, and "borrowed" this film's tagline.

Plot 

In March 1975, a Sino-Soviet border conflict escalates into full-scale war in which biological warfare destroys most of the human race. U.S. Army Col. Robert Neville, M.D., is a scientist based in Los Angeles. As he begins to succumb to the plague, he injects himself with an experimental vaccine, rendering him immune.

By August 1977, Neville believes he is the plague's only immune survivor. Struggling to maintain his sanity, he spends his days patrolling the now-desolate Los Angeles, hunting and killing members of "the Family", a cult of plague victims who were turned into nocturnal albino mutants. The Family seeks to destroy all technology and kill Neville, who has become a symbol of the science they blame for humanity's downfall. At night, living atop a fortified apartment building equipped with an arsenal of weaponry, Neville is a prisoner in his own home.

One day, as Neville is in a department store helping himself to new clothing, he spots a woman, who quickly runs away. He pursues her outside, but later decides he is hallucinating and dismisses the sighting. He also finds the dead body of a mutant—although they survived the plague, the disease will eventually kill them.

On another day, the Family finally captures Neville. After a summary trial, he is found guilty of heresy by the Family's leader, Jonathan Matthias, a former news anchorman. Neville is sentenced to death and nearly burned at the stake in Dodger Stadium. He is rescued by Lisa, the woman he had earlier dismissed as a hallucination, and Dutch, a former medical student. Lisa and Dutch are part of a group of survivors, all of whom are children. Although their youth has given them some resistance to the disease, they are still vulnerable to it, and will eventually succumb to mutation. Neville realizes that even if duplicating the original vaccine is possible,  salvaging humanity would take years. He believes extending his immunity to others may be possible  by creating a serum from his own blood.
 
Neville and Lisa return to Neville's apartment, where they begin treating Lisa's brother Richie, who is succumbing to the disease. Neville and Lisa are about to have a romantic evening together, just as the generator runs out of fuel and the lights go off. The Family then attacks, sending Matthias' second-in-command, Brother Zachary, to climb up the outside of Neville's building to the open balcony of his apartment. Neville leaves Lisa upstairs as he goes to the basement garage to restart the generator. Neville returns to the apartment to find Zachary right behind an unsuspecting Lisa. Neville shoots him and he falls off the balcony to his death, dropping his spear on the balcony as he goes.

If the serum works, Neville and Lisa plan to leave the ravaged city with the rest of the survivors, and start new lives in the wilderness, leaving the Family behind to die. Neville is successful in creating the serum and administers it to Richie. Once cured, Richie reveals the Family's headquarters to Neville (the Los Angeles Civic Center), but insists that the Family is also human and that Neville's cure should be administered to them, as well. Neville disagrees with him, so Richie goes to the Family by himself to try to convince them to take the serum. Matthias refuses to believe that Neville would try to help them, accuses Richie of being sent to spy on them, and has him executed. After finding a note that Richie left, Neville rushes to rescue him, but instead finds his dead body tied to a judge's chair in a courtroom.

Meanwhile, Lisa quickly and unexpectedly succumbs to the disease and becomes one of the Family. Returning home, Neville tells Lisa about Richie's death, but she already knows and has betrayed Neville by giving Matthias and his followers access to Neville's home. Matthias, who finally has the upper hand, forces Neville to watch as the Family sets his home and equipment on fire. Neville breaks free, and once outside with Lisa, he turns and raises his gun to shoot Matthias, who is looking down from the balcony. The gun jams, giving Matthias enough time to hurl Zachary's spear at Neville, mortally wounding him. The next morning, Dutch and the survivors discover Neville dying in a fountain. He hands Dutch a flask of the blood serum, and then dies. Dutch takes Lisa (weakened and compliant because of the sunlight) away, and the survivors leave the city forever.

Cast
 Charlton Heston as Robert Neville
 Anthony Zerbe as Jonathan Matthias
 Rosalind Cash as Lisa
 Paul Koslo as Dutch
 Eric Laneuville as Richie
 Lincoln Kilpatrick as Zachary
 Brian Tochi as Tommy

Production
The film differs from the novel (and the previous film) in several ways. In the novel, humanity is destroyed by a bacterial plague spread by bats and mosquitoes, which turns the population into vampire-like creatures; whereas, in this film version, biological warfare is the cause of the plague that kills most of the population by asphyxiation and turns most of the rest into nocturnal albino mutants. Screenwriter Joyce Corrington holds a doctorate in chemistry and felt that this was more suitable for an adaptation.

In Charlton Heston's autobiography, In the Arena: An Autobiography, he mentioned that the "crucifixion" scene with Neville was not in the original script. As it turns out, the scene was felt to fit quite well into the storyline, so was left in.

The film takes place in Los Angeles,  and as part of the plot, the city is supposed to be void of human activity except for Neville. Several tricks were used to make the city appear deserted. This was accomplished in part by simply filming on a Sunday morning in the center of the business district, which in late 1970 was essentially devoid of pedestrian movement early on weekend mornings. Despite careful planning by the film crew, bystanders were captured on film in the distance, and moving cars appear briefly in the background during some scenes.

Interracial kiss

Whoopi Goldberg has remarked that the kiss between the characters played by Charlton Heston and Rosalind Cash was one of the first interracial kisses to appear in a movie. In 1992, when Goldberg had her own network interview talk show, she invited Heston to be a guest, and asked him about the kiss. After discussing whether Heston received any flak for the kiss at the time, Goldberg said that she wished that society could get past interracial relationships being an issue, at which point Heston leaned forward and demonstrated on the unsuspecting Goldberg.

Screenwriter Joyce H. Corrington stated that in developing the script for The Omega Man, the character of Lisa, played by Rosalind Cash, was created due to the rise of the Black Power movement, which was particularly prominent in American culture at the time the film was made. She goes on to remark that this created an effective and interesting dynamic between the characters of Lisa and Neville.

Heston wrote in his autobiography that The Omega Man was Cash's first leading role in a film, and that she was understandably "a little edgy" about doing a love scene with him. Heston explained, "It was in the seventies that I realized a generation of actors had grown up who saw me in terms of the iconic roles they remembered from their childhoods. 'It's a spooky feeling,' she told me, 'to screw Moses.'"

Deleted scene

The script for The Omega Man contains a scene in which Lisa visits her parents' grave. Unknown to Neville, Lisa is pregnant, and she seeks comfort from her deceased parents before Neville and she leave the city forever. While Lisa is talking to her parents' grave, she hears a sound and investigates a crypt. In it, she spots a female Family member depositing a dead newborn mutant. Lisa can see the mother's grief and empathizes with the woman's loss, despite their being on different sides. Lisa believes that all children, including her unborn baby, will suffer the same fate. Later, Lisa returns to Neville and tells him of the woman in the crypt. Neville asks Lisa if she "took care" of things and Lisa responds that since she may be a grieving parent in a few months, she will not kill a grief-stricken mother. Neville is shocked at first, but then embraces Lisa. While the scene was cut from the final film, the screen credit for "Woman in Cemetery Crypt" remains.

Release
The film opened at three theaters in Houston in July 1971.

Reception 
At the film review aggregator website Rotten Tomatoes, The Omega Man received mixed reviews, with a combined average positive score of 65% from 34 critics. Howard Thompson gave a mostly negative review in The New York Times, saying "the climax is as florid and phony as it can be," while A.D. Murphy of Variety described the film as "an extremely literate science fiction drama." Roger Ebert awarded two stars out of four and found the mutants "a little too ridiculous to quite fulfill their function in the movie." Gene Siskel of the Chicago Tribune gave the film one star out of four, writing that director Boris Sagal "must have resembled a juggler trying to keep four dramatic balls aloft. About midway through the film, the balls started bumping into each other, Sagal began to stumble, and by the time the crew was completing the final scene, Sagal was on the floor with the balls bouncing wildly away from his grasp." Kevin Thomas of the Los Angeles Times wrote that the film was "strictly a potboiler, but it's without pretensions and never runs dry. Director Boris Sagal has captured some stark apocalyptic images and gotten some suitably vivid performances. Most importantly, he keeps things moving so fast that there's not enough time to ponder credibility gaps big enough to fly a Boeing 747 through." Tom Shales of The Washington Post wrote, "Director Sagal displays no great affinity for science fiction — he's from TV land — but he generally upholds interest and can certainly handle the shocks and suspense, which are both abundant and enjoyable in a Saturday matinee way."

Director Tim Burton said in an interview for his 2009 Museum of Modern Art exhibit that "If I was alone on a desert island, I'd probably pick something that I could relate to—probably The Omega Man with Charlton Heston. I don't know why that is one of my favorite movies, but it is." In another interview, with the Australian Centre for the Moving Image (ACMI), Burton remarked that no matter how many times he has seen it, if it is on television, he will stop to watch it. He said that when he originally saw The Omega Man, it was the first instance that he recalls seeing the use of certain types of "cheesy one-liners" in film. The film is full of irony-tinged one-liners that are spoken in a manner to elicit a comic response. Burton compares these to the famous one-liners in Arnold Schwarzenegger's film career, such as "I'll be back."

As with The Last Man on Earth, The Omega Man wasn't to Richard Matheson's liking; on the other hand, it didn't provoke much of a reaction from the author, either. "The Omega Man was so removed from my book that it didn’t even bother me," Matheson said.

Box office
The film grossed $29,900 in its first week. It went on to earn $4 million in theatrical rentals in the United States and Canada.

In popular culture 
 The first short in The Simpsons Treehouse of Horror VIII special, "The HΩmega Man", is an homage to the film, with its basic story happening in Springfield.
 Famous Paraguayan-Argentine comic-book writer Robin Wood and Argentine artist Ricardo Villagrán created the 1970s classic Argentine historieta (comic) Mark strictly based on The Omega Man'''s postapocalyptic world. The eponymous hero and protagonist, Mark, is also based on Neville's character concept of a man of action.
 Bob McKenzie, in the beginning of the film Strange Brew, states, "I was kind of like a one-man force like Charlton Heston in Omega Man. Did you see it? It was beauty."
 The 1981 album Ghost in the Machine by The Police features a track "Omegaman" (also stylised as "Ωmegaman") written by Andy Summers, based on the film.
 The scene in which Heston's character watches Woodstock inspired Joel Hodgson to create Mystery Science Theater 3000''.

See also
 List of American films of 1971
 Survival film, about the film genre, with a list of related films

References

External links 

 
 
 
 

1971 films
1970s English-language films
1970s disaster films
1970s science fiction action films
1970s science fiction thriller films
American disaster films
American science fiction thriller films
American science fiction action films
Films based on works by Richard Matheson
Films based on science fiction novels
Films based on thriller novels
Films directed by Boris Sagal
Films set in 1975
Films set in 1977
Films set in Los Angeles
Films set in the future
Films shot in Los Angeles
Mannequins in films
American post-apocalyptic films
Films about viral outbreaks
1970s science fiction horror films
Warner Bros. films
Films based on American horror novels
American survival films
Films scored by Ron Grainer
1970s American films